Bacha Khan University  is a public university situated in Charsadda, Khyber Pakhtunkhwa, Pakistan, named after  Abdul Ghaffar Khan (Bacha Khan). The university was founded on 3 July 2012 with the mission to advance knowledge and learning through quality research and education for Pakistan.

Currently, the university's campus consists of 25 acres, with another 97 acres of land being purchased near Charsadda, Motorway Interchange. The Academic Departments at Bacha Khan University, Charsadda currently include more than 3047 students who are enrolled in BS, Masters and MS/MPhil degree programs. There are two boys and one girls' hostel at the campus.

Departments 
Bacha Khan University offers education in the following areas:

Agriculture
Biotechnology
Botany & Zoology
Chemistry
Computer Science & Electronics
Economics
English
Geology & Geophysics
Management Science
Mathematics and Statistics
Pakhtunkhwa Study Centre
Pharmacy
Sociology & Gender Studies & Education

See also
List of universities in Khyber Pakhtunkhwa

References

2012 establishments in Pakistan
Charsadda District, Pakistan
Educational institutions established in 2012
Public universities and colleges in Khyber Pakhtunkhwa